In physics, the Maxwell–Jüttner distribution is the distribution of speeds of particles in a hypothetical gas of relativistic particles. Similar to Maxwell's distribution, the Maxwell–Jüttner distribution considers a classical ideal gas where the particles are dilute and do not significantly interact with each other. The distinction from Maxwell's case is that effects of special relativity are taken into account.

The distribution can be attributed to Ferencz Jüttner, who derived it in 1911. It has become known as the Maxwell–Jüttner distribution by analogy to the name Maxwell-Boltzmann distribution that is commonly used to refer to Maxwell's distribution.

Definition 

Alternatively, this can be written in terms of the momentum as

where . The Maxwell–Jüttner equation is covariant, but not manifestly so, and the temperature of the gas does not vary with the gross speed of the gas.

Jüttner distribution graph 
A visual representation of the distribution in particle velocities for plasmas at four different temperatures: 

Where we have defined the thermal parameter .

The four general limits are: 
 ultrarelativistic temperatures μ << 1 
 relativistic temperatures: μ < 1, 
 weakly (or mildly) relativistic temperatures: μ > 1 ,
 low temperatures: μ >> 1,

Limitations

Some limitations of the Maxwell–Jüttner distributions are shared with the classical ideal gas: neglect of interactions, and neglect of quantum effects. An additional limitation (not important in the classical ideal gas) is that the Maxwell–Jüttner distribution neglects antiparticles.

The resulting thermal distribution will depend on the chemical potential relating to the conserved particle-antiparticle number difference. A further consequence of this is that it becomes necessary to incorporate statistical mechanics for indistinguishable particles, because the occupation probabilities for low kinetic energy states becomes of order unity. For fermions it is necessary to use Fermi–Dirac statistics and the result is analogous to the thermal generation of electron-hole pairs in semiconductors. For bosonic particles, it is necessary to use the Bose–Einstein statistics.

Perhaps most significantly, the basic MB distribution has two main issues: it does not extend to particles moving at relativistic speeds, and  it assumes anisotropic temperature (where each DOF hasn’t the same translational kinetic energy). While the classic Maxwell-Juttner distribution generalizes for the case of special relativity, it fails to consider the anisotropic description.

Derivation  
The Maxwell–Boltzmann (MB) distribution PM describes the velocities u or the kinetic energy  of the particles at thermal equilibrium, far from the limit of the speed of light, i.e:

Or, in terms of the kinetic energy:

where θ is the temperature in speed dimensions, called thermal speed, and d denotes the kinetic degrees of freedom of each particle. (Note that the temperature is defined in the fluid’s rest frame, where the bulk speed ub is zero. In the non-relativistic case, this can be shown by using ε =  .

The relativistic generalization of Eq. (1a), that is, the Maxwell–Jüttner (MJ) distribution, is given by:

where β ≡  and γ (β) ≡ (1- . (Note that the inverse of the unitless temperature  is the relativistic coldness ζ , Rezzola and Zanotti, 2013.) This distribution (Eq. 2) can be derived as follows. According to the relativistic formalism for the particle momentum and energy, we have

The Boltzmann distribution of a Hamiltonian is Pmj(H)  In the absence of a potential energy, H is simply given by the particle energy E, thus:

(Note that E is the sum of the kinetic ε and inertial energy ). Then, when we include the d-dimensional density of states:

So that:

Where denotes the d-dimensional solid angle. For isotropic distributions, we have

or

Then,  so that:

Or:

Now, because . Then, we normalize the distribution Eq. (7). We set

And the angular integration:

Where  is the surface of the unit d-dimensional sphere. Then, using the identity  we have:

;

and

Where we have defined the integral:

The Macdonald function (Avramovitz and Stegun, 1972, p.376) is defined by:

So that, by setting  we obtain:

Hence,

Or

The inverse of the normalization constant gives the partition function 

Therefore, the normalized distribution is:

Or we may derive the normalized distribution in terms of:

Note that  can be shown to coincide with the thermodynamic definition of temperature.

Also useful is the expression of the distribution in the velocity space (Dunkel et al., 2007). Given that , we have:

Hence

Take d=3 (the “classic case” in our world):

And

Note that when the MB distribution clearly deviates from the MJ distribution of the same temperature and dimensionality, one can misinterpret and deduce a different MB distribution that will give a good approximation to the MJ distribution. This new MB distribution can be either (i) a convected MB distribution, that is, an MB distribution with the same dimensionality, but with different temperature Tmb and bulk speed ub (or bulk energy), or (ii) an MB distribution with the same bulk speed, but with different temperature TMB and degrees of freedom dMB. These two types of approximations are illustrated.

References

Gases
Special relativity